Françoise Jeanne Lajunias Delord (née Doucet; 30 January 1940 – 3 December 2021) was a French ornithologist and zoo owner who was the founder and director of ZooParc de Beauval. After acting at Bobino, Delord became an ornithologist, authoring two books on the topic in the 1970s. In 1980, she opened an ornithological park, which later expanded to become the ZooParc de Beauval in 1989.

Early life
Delord was born 30 January 1940 and raised by a single mother in Montargis. She studied at the Lycée Jeanne d'Arc in Orléans and subsequently at CNSAD. Delord initially began her career as an actress. She dreamed of entering the Comédie-Française and play the title role in the tragedy Phaedra. She worked at Bobino and presented 11 shows per week. For six years, she frequently interacted with artists such as Jacques Brel, Léo Ferré and Georges Brassens. While working in the theatre, she met her husband, a magician with whom she had two children: Rodolphe and Delphine. The couple later divorced.

Ornithological career 

In the early 1970s, Delord won two African silverbill birds as part of a contest, which would trigger her inspiration for a zoological park. She became an ornithologist, writing two books about birds. Delord frequently purchased new birds at pet stores and built an aviary in her Paris apartment. When the total number of birds reached 300, she and her family moved out of Paris and settled on a five-hectare property near Saint-Aignan. 

In 1980, Delord opened an ornithological park, which was transformed into ZooParc de Beauval in 1989 following the acquisition of wildcats. In 1991, the zoo’s stature grew when she acquired a pair of rare white tigers. In 2001, she was the only female French zoo director. At the 2006 Chinese Committee of Breeding Techniques for Giant Pandas in Thailand, Delord expressed a desire to adopt a pair of giant pandas. The zoo reached international profile when China loaned it a pair of pandas in 2012. As of 2011, it was home to 4600 animals, and was the only collection in France with koalas or manatees. 

When Delord aged, she left control of the park to her children, Rodolphe and Delphine. In 2021, the zoo has 1.4 million visitors. 

Françoise Delord died on 3 December 2021 at the age of 81.

Selected works

References

1940 births
2021 deaths
Zookeepers
Zoo owners
People from Montargis
20th-century French businesspeople
French ornithologists
Women ornithologists
20th-century French actresses
Conservatoire de Paris alumni